Gilderoy may refer to:
 Gilderoy, Victoria, a bounded rural locality in Victoria, Australia
 Gilderoy (outlaw) (executed 1636), Scottish outlaw and blackmailer
Gilderoy Lockhart, fictional wizard in the Harry Potter series